Bahir Dar Kenema Football Club (Amharic: ባህርዳር ከነማ እግር ኳስ ክለብ) also known as Bahir Dar City, is an Ethiopian football club based in Bahir Dar. They play in the Ethiopian Premier League, the top division of football in Ethiopia.

History 
Bahir Dar Kenema was established in 1973 EC in the city of Bahir Dar.

Bahir Dar enjoyed a good run of form in the 2017–18 season leading Group A of the Ethiopian Higher League with 31 points after the 14th week.

On July 29, 2018, the club secured promotion to the Ethiopian Premier League for the first time in its history after beating Ethiopian Insurance F.C. The win assured them the top spot in group A in the Ethiopian Higher League (second tier) with three games to spare in their 2017–18 season, by virtue securing their spot in the top league the next season.

On August 6, 2018, the club announced they had extended the contract of Paulos Getachew through the 2018–19 season.

in September 2022 bahir dar kenema announced the new coach degarege yigzaw who is the past player of bahir dar and st george Fc

Stadium 
Bahir Dar Kenema play their home matches at Bahir Dar International Stadium.  They share the stadium with Amhara Weha Sera, another club based in Bahir Dar.

Support 
Bahir Dar Kenema enjoys a strong fan base with supporters often traveling with the team during away matches.

Departments

Active Departments 

 Women's Football Team
 under 20 Men's football team

Players

First-team squad

As of 1 January 2023

Club Officials

Coaching Staff 
As of 1 January 2023

Manager/Head Coach: Degarege yigzaw

Assistant Coach: Dereje mengistu

Assistant Coach: Ashagre 

nutrition : Dr tesfaye 

Technical director : Mebratu habtu  

team leader : Henok habtu

Former Players 

  Alex Amuzu

References

1973 establishments in Africa
Football clubs in Ethiopia
Sport in Amhara Region